The 2000 Masters Tournament was the 64th Masters Tournament, held April 6–9 at Augusta National Golf Club in Augusta, Georgia. Vijay Singh won his only Masters, three strokes ahead of runner-up Ernie Els. It was the second of Singh's three major titles.

Course

Field
Each player is classified according to the first category by which he qualified, with other categories in which he qualified shown in parentheses.

1. Masters champions
Tommy Aaron, Seve Ballesteros, Gay Brewer, Billy Casper, Charles Coody, Fred Couples (16,17), Ben Crenshaw, Nick Faldo, Raymond Floyd, Doug Ford, Bernhard Langer (10), Sandy Lyle, Larry Mize, Jack Nicklaus, José María Olazábal (16,17), Mark O'Meara (3,16,17), Arnold Palmer, Gary Player, Craig Stadler, Tom Watson, Tiger Woods (4,11,14,15,16,17), Ian Woosnam (10), Fuzzy Zoeller
George Archer, Jack Burke Jr., Bob Goalby, Herman Keiser, Byron Nelson, Sam Snead, and Art Wall Jr. did not play.

2. U.S. Open champions (last five years)
Ernie Els (14,16,17), Lee Janzen (10,16,17), Steve Jones, Corey Pavin
Payne Stewart, the 1999 U.S. Open champion, died in a plane crash in October 1999.

3. The Open champions (last five years)
John Daly, Paul Lawrie (16,17), Tom Lehman (14,16,17), Justin Leonard (5,13,14,16,17)

4. PGA champions (last five years)
Mark Brooks, Steve Elkington (10,14,16,17), Davis Love III (10,14,16,17), Vijay Singh (11,14,16,17)

5. The Players Championship winners (last three years)
David Duval (10,11,14,16,17), Hal Sutton (11,14,16,17)

6. U.S. Amateur champion and runner-up
David Gossett (a), Kim Sung-yoon (a)

7. The Amateur champion
Graeme Storm (a)

8. U.S. Amateur Public Links champion
Hunter Haas (a)

9. U.S. Mid-Amateur champion
Danny Green (a)

10. Top 16 players and ties from the 1999 Masters
Bob Estes (14,16,17), Carlos Franco (14,16,17), Jim Furyk (14,16,17), Brandt Jobe, Phil Mickelson (11,14,16,17), Colin Montgomerie (16,17), Greg Norman (16), Steve Pate (14,16,17), Nick Price (14,16,17), Lee Westwood (16,17)

11. Top eight players and ties from the 1999 U.S. Open
Tim Herron (14,16,17), Jeff Maggert (14,16,17), Steve Stricker (16,17)

12. Top four players and ties from 1999 PGA Championship
Stewart Cink (14,16,17), Sergio García (16,17), Jay Haas

13. Top four players and ties from the 1999 Open Championship
Ángel Cabrera, Craig Parry (14,16,17), Jean van de Velde

14. Top 40 players from the 1999 PGA Tour money list
Stuart Appleby (16,17), Notah Begay III, Glen Day (16,17), Fred Funk (16), Brent Geiberger (16,17), Scott Gump, Dudley Hart (16,17), Gabriel Hjertstedt, Scott Hoch (16,17), John Huston (16,17), Skip Kendall, Rocco Mediate, Jesper Parnevik (15,16,17), Dennis Paulson, Chris Perry (16,17), Loren Roberts (16), Jeff Sluman (16,17), David Toms (16,17), Ted Tryba, Duffy Waldorf, Mike Weir (17)
Since Payne Stewart finished in the top 40 of the money list, an invitation was given to Hjertstedt, the 41st-place finisher.

15. Top 3 players from the 2000 PGA Tour money list on March 5
Kirk Triplett (17)

16. Top 50 players from the final 1999 world ranking
Thomas Bjørn (17), Darren Clarke (17), Retief Goosen (17), Pádraig Harrington, Miguel Ángel Jiménez (17), Masashi Ozaki (17), Naomichi Ozaki (17), Bob Tway (17), Brian Watts (17)

17. Top 50 players from world ranking published March 5
Paul Azinger, Shigeki Maruyama

18. Special foreign invitation
Aaron Baddeley (a)

All the amateurs except Danny Green were playing in their first Masters, as were Notah Begay III, Ángel Cabrera, Brent Geiberger, Pádraig Harrington, Skip Kendall, Paul Lawrie, Dennis Paulson, Jean van de Velde, and Mike Weir. Sergio García made his first appearance as a professional.

Round summaries

First round
Thursday, April 6, 2000

Second round
Friday, April 7, 2000

Amateurs: Gossett (+2), Baddeley (+5), Green (+5), Kim (+6), Haas (+9), Storm (+15).

Third round
Saturday, April 8, 2000
& Sunday, April 9, 2000

The third round was suspended by darkness due to two-hour rain delay and completed on Sunday morning.

Final round
Sunday, April 9, 2000

Final leaderboard

Sources:

Scorecard

Cumulative tournament scores, relative to par
{|class="wikitable" span = 50 style="font-size:85%;
|-
|style="background: Pink;" width=10|
|Birdie
|style="background: PaleGreen;" width=10|
|Bogey
|}
Source:

References

External links
Masters.com – past winners
Coverage on the European Tour's official site
Augusta.com – 2000 Masters leaderboard and scorecards

2000
2000 in golf
2000 in American sports
2000 in sports in Georgia (U.S. state)
April 2000 sports events in the United States